Herbert Jans (born 15 February 1979) is a Chilean rower. He competed in the men's lightweight coxless four event at the 2000 Summer Olympics.

References

1979 births
Living people
Chilean male rowers
Olympic rowers of Chile
Rowers at the 2000 Summer Olympics
People from Valdivia